Joseph Root (1860 – 29 October 1912) was a well-known hermit who lived in what is now Presque Isle State Park in Pennsylvania. Born in Erie, Pennsylvania,  Root lived on Presque Isle without any modern conveniences.
He has sometimes been nicknamed "the King of the Peninsula" or "the King of Presque Isle".

Life

Presque Isle State Park
Root moved away from his childhood home to Presque Isle while still in his adolescent years. As one of the first permanent inhabitants to the peninsula (Presque Isle wasn't declared an official state park until 1921), he built a number of shacks in various parts of the peninsula to suit the particular activity of any given day. There was also a lighthouse keeper who resided at the park during the late 19th century and he often had his tomatoes swiped by Root.

Root built his shacks out of driftwood, packing crates and anything else that washed up on shore. Root hunted and fished to support himself in the harsh environment he would become fond of raw fish in particular. There was a rumor that a dead cow once washed up on the shore of Presque Isle and Root fed off of it for an entire week. Root also ate local wild plants such as wild cattails, duck potatoes, spatterdocks, rice, blueberries, dewberries, and wild strawberries.

Root was a favorite with local children, entertaining them with ventriloquism and stories about his "friends". These friends were called the Jee-Bees (alternatively known as either GBs or jeebies); they were invisible nature spirits who could accurately predict the weather. During long winter nights, Root would walk to Erie to spend some time at the local poorhouse. Locals could sometimes see him walking on State Street with either a fishing net or a cane pole.

Business ideas and later life
One of his business ideas was to build a balloon factory, and use the prevailing westerly winds to transport travelers across state lines to Buffalo, New York.

Root was committed to the Warren State Hospital for the Insane in Warren, Pennsylvania, on 14 April 1910 after a short stay at an Erie-area poorhouse. Stories suggest he was sent there because authorities feared he'd claim the peninsula as his home through adverse possession.

Legacy
Joe Root is remembered in the Erie, Pennsylvania, area as a colorful character and something of a symbol of Erie's history. A now-shuttered local restaurant, Joe Root's Grill, whose last day open for business was 30 September 2019, honored his name, as does a winter golf tournament, Joe Root's Frostbite Open (sponsored by local businesses, one of which was the restaurant).

References

External links

1860 births
1912 deaths
19th-century American people
American hermits
People from Erie, Pennsylvania